Ochsenheimeria glabratella is a moth of the family Ypsolophidae. It is found in Germany, France, Switzerland, Austria and Italy.

References

Moths described in 1914
Ypsolophidae
Moths of Europe